This is a list of rivers in the state of South Dakota in the United States.

By tributary

Minnesota River watershed
Little Minnesota River
Jorgenson River
Whetstone River
North Fork Yellow Bank River
South Fork Yellow Bank River
West Branch Lac qui Parle River

Missouri River
Little Missouri River
Grand River
Black Horse Butte Creek
Cedar Boy Creek
Cottonwood Creek
Cottonwood Creek
Cyclone Creek
Dirt Lodge Creek
Little Soldier Creek
Firesteel Creek
Flat Creek
East Flat Creek
High Bank Creek
Hump Creek
Lodgepole Creek
Louse Creek
Meadow Creek
North Fork Grand River
Billy Young Creek
Buffalo Creek
Crooked Creek
Petes Creek
Deer Creek
Horse Creek
Lone Tree Creek
Slick Creek
Plum Creek
Rock Creek
Soldier Creek
Stink Creek
Iron Dog Creek
South Fork Grand River
Bar H Creek
Bog Creek
Boxelder Creek
Box Spring Creek
Brush Creek
Bull Creek
Butcher Creek
Clarks Fork Creek
Coal Creek
Defenball Creek
Duck Creek
Eggland Creek
Fisher Creek
Graves Creek
Hay Creek
Horse Creek
Jerry Creek
Jones Creek
Little Grand River
Little Nasty Creek
Middle Creek
Olson Creek
Pine Spring Creek
Prairie Dog Creek
Rush Creek
Sand Creek
Sheep Creek
Slick Creek
Skull Creek
Snake Creek
Timber Draw Creek
White Hill Creek
Thunder Hawk Creek
East Thunder Hawk Creek
White Shirt Creek
Moreau River
Little Moreau River
North Fork Moreau River
South Fork Moreau River
Cheyenne River
Battle Creek
Iron Creek
Toll Gate Creek
French Creek
Fall River
Rapid Creek
Castle Creek
Belle Fourche River
Owl Creek
Redwater River
Spearfish Creek
Cherry Creek
Bad River
American Creek
White River
Wounded Knee Creek
Little White River
Niobrara River (Nebraska)
Keya Paha River
James River
Elm River
Maple River
Vermillion River
Baptist Creek
Little Vermillion River
Spirit Mound Creek
Ponca Creek
Big Sioux River
Indian River
Skunk Creek
Split Rock Creek

Red River of the North watershed
Bois de Sioux River

Alphabetically

American Creek
Bad River
Baptist Creek
Belle Fourche River
Big Sioux River
Bois de Sioux River
Castle Creek
Cherry Creek
Cheyenne River
Elm River
Fall River
French Creek
Grand River
Indian River
James River
Jorgenson River
Keya Paha River
Lac qui Parle River, West Branch
Laundreaux Creek
Little Minnesota River
Little Missouri River
Little Moreau River
Little Vermillion River
Little White River
Maple River
Missouri River
Moreau River
North Fork Grand River
Owl Creek
Ponca Creek
Rapid Creek
Redwater River
Skunk Creek
South Fork Grand River
Spearfish Creek
Spirit Mound Creek
Split Rock Creek
Vermillion River
Whetstone River
White River
Wounded Knee Creek
Yellow Bank River, North Fork and South Fork

See also

 List of rivers in the United States

South Dakota rivers
 
Rivers